The 2010 FIFA Ballon d'Or Gala was the inaugural year for FIFA's awards for the top football players and coaches of the year. The gala is a continuation of the FIFA World Player Gala and a result of merging the FIFA Men's World Player of the Year award with the Ballon d'Or, previously created and presented by France Football to the top men's player in Europe. The awards ceremony took place on 10 January 2011 in Zürich, Switzerland. The three finalists for each category were announced on 6 December 2010.

La Masia, the FC Barcelona academy, achieved a record breaking honor in becoming the first youth academy ever to have all three finalists for the Ballon d'Or in one same year, with Lionel Messi, Andrés Iniesta and Xavi. Messi won the award, his second consecutive Ballon d'Or victory. 

Marta won the FIFA Women's World Player of the Year award, her fifth in a row.

José Mourinho, Portuguese manager of Real Madrid and previously of Internazionale, was the first winner of the men's FIFA World Coach of the Year award in 2010. The women's version of the award was won by Germany head coach Silvia Neid.

Winners and nominees

FIFA Ballon d'Or 

The following 20 men were also in contention for the FIFA Ballon d’Or 2010:

FIFA Women's World Player of the Year 

The other seven nominees were:

FIFA World Coach of the Year for Men's Football

FIFA World Coach of the Year for Women's Football

FIFA Puskás Award

FIFA/FIFPro World XI

FIFA Presidential Award 

  Desmond Tutu

FIFA Fair Play Award

References

External links 
 France Football Official Ballon d'Or page

2010
Fifa Ballon Dor, 2010
Fifa Ballon Dor, 2010
2010 sports awards
Women's association football trophies and awards
2010 in women's association football